John Randolph (6 July 1749 – 28 July 1813) was a British scholar, teacher, and cleric who rose to become Bishop of London.

Early life and academic career
He was born in Much Hadham, Hertfordshire, the son of Thomas Randolph, President of Corpus Christi College, Oxford and educated at Westminster School and Christ Church, Oxford. He was awarded BA in 1771, MA in 1774 and BD in 1782.

He was associated with Oxford University as a resident and instructor from 1779 to 1783. In 1776 he was made Professor of Poetry, in 1782 Regius Professor of Greek and in 1783 Regius Professor of Divinity.

Episcopal career
In 1799, Randolph was named the Bishop of Oxford, and in 1807 was translated to the see of the Bishop of Bangor. He retained the post of Regius professor until his move to Bangor. Randolph was not particularly liberal. In debating the expansion of free schools, he noted that educating the poor would "...puff up their tender minds or entice them into a way of life of no benefit to the publick and ensnaring to themselves."

On 12 June 1809, he was made the Bishop of London, and ex officio a member of the Privy Council of the United Kingdom. In December 1811, he was elected a Fellow of the Royal Society.

He died in office in 1813 and was buried in Fulham churchyard. He had married Jane, daughter of Thomas Lambard of Sevenoaks, Kent in 1785; they had six children.

References

External links
Papers of Bishop Randolph at Lambeth Palace Library
 

1749 births
1813 deaths
People from Much Hadham
Bishops of Bangor
Bishops of Oxford
Bishops of London
Deans of the Chapel Royal
Fellows of the Royal Society
18th-century Church of England bishops
19th-century Church of England bishops
Oxford Professors of Poetry
Alumni of Christ Church, Oxford
Regius Professors of Greek (University of Oxford)
Regius Professors of Divinity (University of Oxford)
Burials at All Saints Church, Fulham
19th-century Welsh Anglican bishops